Amici may refer to:

 Amicus curiae, a legal Latin phrase translated to "friend of the court"
 Amici Principis, another term for cohors amicorum, "cohort of friends"
 Amici (crater), on the Moon
 Amici Forever, a band
 Amici prism, a type of compound dispersive prism used in spectrometers
 Amici roof prism, a type of reflecting prism used to deviate a beam of light by 90° while simultaneously inverting the image
 Andrea Amici (born 1971), Italian male retired sprinter
 Giovanni Battista Amici (1786–1863), Italian astronomer, microscopist, and botanist
 Giuliana Amici (born 1952), former Italian javelin thrower, later became masters athlete
 Amici di Maria De Filippi, Italian talent show
 Amici, the song of Phi Kappa Psi fraternity
 Amici della Domenica ("Sunday Friends"), the group that awarded the Strega Prize
 Opus sacerdotale Amici Israel, international Roman Catholic association founded in Rome in February 1926